Mark Roberts (born 28 June 1965) is a former Australian rules footballer who played for the Sydney Swans, Brisbane Bears and North Melbourne in the Victorian/Australian Football League (VFL/AFL).

Nicknamed the "Fridge", he played 18 games in 2 seasons with Sydney Swans, 59 games in four seasons with Brisbane Bears and 125 with the North Melbourne Kangaroos. His height was 189 cm and his weight was 96 kg (formerly 104 kg).

He was recruited from the St George Football Club in Sydney.

In 2001, Roberts and former teammate David King were charged with assaulting a hot dog seller.
 
In 2006, Roberts was senior coach for the Labrador Football Club in the AFL Queensland.

Statistics

|- style="background-color: #EAEAEA"
! scope="row" style="text-align:center" | 1985
|
| 51 || 6 || 4 || 4 || 31 || 9 || 40 || 13 ||  || 0 || 0.7 || 0.7 || 5.2 || 1.5 || 6.7 || 2.2 ||  || 0.0 || 0
|- 
! scope="row" style="text-align:center" | 1986
|
| 27 || 12 || 1 || 1 || 87 || 43 || 130 || 23 ||  || 2 || 0.1 || 0.1 || 7.3 || 3.6 || 10.8 || 1.9 ||  || 0.2 || 3
|- style="background-color: #EAEAEA"
! scope="row" style="text-align:center" | 1987
|
| 27 || 14 || 0 || 0 || 77 || 47 || 124 || 29 || 11 || 0 || 0.0 || 0.0 || 5.5 || 3.4 || 8.9 || 2.1 || 0.8 || 0.0 || 0
|- 
! scope="row" style="text-align:center" | 1988
|
| 27 || 8 || 1 || 1 || 52 || 18 || 70 || 13 || 3 || 3 || 0.1 || 0.1 || 6.5 || 2.3 || 8.8 || 1.6 || 0.4 || 0.4 || 0
|- style="background-color: #EAEAEA"
! scope="row" style="text-align:center" | 1989
|
| 27 || 19 || 5 || 3 || 166 || 83 || 249 || 61 || 17 || 3 || 0.3 || 0.2 || 8.7 || 4.4 || 13.1 || 3.2 || 0.9 || 0.2 || 0
|- 
! scope="row" style="text-align:center" | 1990
|
| 27 || 18 || 8 || 11 || 162 || 88 || 250 || 66 || 15 || 9 || 0.4 || 0.6 || 9.0 || 4.9 || 13.9 || 3.7 || 0.8 || 0.5 || 0
|- style="background-color: #EAEAEA"
! scope="row" style="text-align:center" | 1991
|
| 22 || 12 || 8 || 6 || 116 || 81 || 197 || 41 || 13 || 14 || 0.7 || 0.5 || 9.7 || 6.8 || 16.4 || 3.4 || 1.1 || 1.2 || 0
|- 
! scope="row" style="text-align:center" | 1992
|
| 22 || 1 || 0 || 2 || 6 || 1 || 7 || 2 || 1 || 0 || 0.0 || 2.0 || 6.0 || 1.0 || 7.0 || 2.0 || 1.0 || 0.0 || 0
|- style="background-color: #EAEAEA"
! scope="row" style="text-align:center" | 1993
|
| 22 || 21 || 47 || 14 || 223 || 103 || 326 || 66 || 21 || 38 || 2.2 || 0.7 || 10.6 || 4.9 || 15.5 || 3.1 || 1.0 || 1.8 || 0
|- 
! scope="row" style="text-align:center" | 1994
|
| 22 || 10 || 23 || 18 || 116 || 54 || 170 || 43 || 9 || 3 || 2.3 || 1.8 || 11.6 || 5.4 || 17.0 || 4.3 || 0.9 || 0.3 || 0
|- style="background-color: #EAEAEA"
! scope="row" style="text-align:center" | 1995
|
| 22 || 21 || 16 || 14 || 152 || 81 || 233 || 52 || 8 || 30 || 0.8 || 0.7 || 7.2 || 3.9 || 11.1 || 2.5 || 0.4 || 1.4 || 1
|- 
|style="text-align:center;background:#afe6ba;"|1996†
|
| 22 || 22 || 25 || 20 || 227 || 110 || 337 || 72 || 32 || 25 || 1.1 || 0.9 || 10.3 || 5.0 || 15.3 || 3.3 || 1.5 || 1.1 || 2
|- style="background-color: #EAEAEA"
! scope="row" style="text-align:center" | 1997
|
| 22 || 22 || 17 || 21 || 250 || 101 || 351 || 84 || 28 || 36 || 0.8 || 1.0 || 11.4 || 4.6 || 16.0 || 3.8 || 1.3 || 1.6 || 3
|- 
! scope="row" style="text-align:center" | 1998
|
| 22 || 15 || 14 || 15 || 162 || 80 || 242 || 51 || 16 || 44 || 0.9 || 1.0 || 10.8 || 5.3 || 16.1 || 3.4 || 1.1 || 2.9 || 3
|- style="background-color: #EAEAEA"
! scope="row" style="text-align:center" | 1999
|
| 22 || 1 || 0 || 0 || 0 || 2 || 2 || 0 || 0 || 0 || 0.0 || 0.0 || 0.0 || 2.0 || 2.0 || 0.0 || 0.0 || 0.0 || 0
|- class="sortbottom"
! colspan=3| Career
! 202
! 169
! 130
! 1827
! 901
! 2728
! 616
! 174
! 207
! 0.8
! 0.6
! 9.0
! 4.5
! 13.5
! 3.0
! 0.9
! 1.0
! 12
|}

References

External links 
 Premiership stars to celebrate reunion
 

Living people
Australian rules footballers from New South Wales
Brisbane Bears players
North Melbourne Football Club players
North Melbourne Football Club Premiership players
Sydney Swans players
St George AFC players
1965 births
Allies State of Origin players
New South Wales Australian rules football State of Origin players
One-time VFL/AFL Premiership players